Naples Botanical Garden is a  botanical garden located in Naples, Florida.

History

The botanical garden was founded in 1993 and consists of 170 acres of cultivated gardens and preservation land, representing seven distinct natural habitats and ecosystems, and featuring over 1000 species, with special emphasis on the ecosystems between the 26th parallel north and the 26th parallel south.

See also 
 List of botanical gardens and arboretums in Florida

References

External links
 Naples Botanical Garden

Botanical gardens in Florida
Buildings and structures in Naples, Florida
Parks in Collier County, Florida